Opal S. Trout Hill (June 2, 1892 – June 23, 1981) was an American professional golfer. She won the Women's Western Open in 1935 and 1936.

Opal Trout was born in Newport, Nebraska but was raised in Kansas City, Missouri. She married Oscar S. Hill, an attorney. As she was suffering from a lingering kidney infection, her doctor recommended mild exercise and she took up golf at the age of 31. She won numerous amateur tournaments.

Hill became a golf professional in 1938, and was one of the 13 founders of the Ladies Professional Golf Association in 1950.

Hill died in Kansas City, Missouri at the age of 89.

Amateur wins
this list is incomplete
1928 Trans-Mississippi Women's Amateur, North and South Women's Amateur
1929 Women's Western Amateur, Trans-Mississippi Women's Amateur
1931 Women's Western Amateur, Trans-Mississippi Women's Amateur
1932 Women's Western Amateur
1934 Trans-Mississippi Women's Amateur
1935 Missouri Women's Amateur
1936 Missouri Women's Amateur
1937 Missouri Women's Amateur

Major championships

Wins (2)

Team appearances
Amateur
Curtis Cup (representing the United States): 1932 (winners), 1934 (winners), 1936 (tie, Cup retained)

References

External links
 

American female golfers
LPGA Tour golfers
Winners of LPGA major golf championships
Golfers from Nebraska
Golfers from Missouri
People from Rock County, Nebraska
People from Kansas City, Missouri
1892 births
1981 deaths
20th-century American women